Lilo & Stitch: The Series is an American animated television series produced by Walt Disney Television Animation that aired for 65 episodes over two seasons. Bookended by the animated films Stitch! The Movie (2003) and Leroy & Stitch (2006), it first aired between the ABC Kids programming block and Disney Channel from 2003 to 2006. It is the first television series in the Lilo & Stitch franchise and a sequel to the 2002 animated film Lilo & Stitch. In this series, Hawaiian girl Lilo Pelekai and her alien best friend and adopted "dog" Stitch adventure around the island of Kauai searching for, naming, and rehabilitating Stitch's predecessor "cousins", who are his creator Dr. Jumba Jookiba's 625 other genetic experiments.

Note that Stitch, Experiment 626, appears in every episode, so he is not included in the "Experiments mentioned" list. Experiments' numbers are based on those seen in the list of experiments shown in the credits of Leroy & Stitch. In addition, Reuben, Experiment 625, wasn't named until Leroy & Stitch and was only referred to as "625" throughout the show; his later-given name is only shown in the "Experiments mentioned" list for convenience. Some experiments were given incorrect numbers in certain episodes; these and other discrepancies are noted below.

Series overview

Pilot film

Episodes

Season 1 (2003–04)

Season 2 (2004–06)

Television finale film

Notes

External links 
 
 Lilo & Stitch: The Series at theTVDB.com

Lilo & Stitch (franchise)
Lists of Disney Channel television series episodes
Lists of American children's animated television series episodes
Lists of American science fiction television series episodes